Ladder Street is a street in the Central and Western District of Hong Kong, consisting entirely of steps and landings formed by granite slabs or concrete paving. It was so named because it extends straight up and down like a ladder. The street has been listed as a Grade I historic building.

History
Ladder Street was built between 1841 and 1850. The name 'Ladder Street' first appeared on a plan of Victoria dated 1856.

Location
Ladder Street starts north at the junction of Queen's Road Central and Lok Ku Road. It extends up and south to Caine Road. It intersects with Hollywood Road and Bridges Street and has junctions with Upper Lascar Row, Square Street and Rozario Street.

Features
The Man Mo Temple on Hollywood Road is located at the corner of Ladder Street.

The Chinese YMCA of Hong Kong, Bridges Street Centre, is located at the corner of Bridges Street and Ladder Street.

Metal railings have been installed at the centre of the street and open drainage channels are located at each side to drain off rainwater. Many old sections of stone retaining walls and boundary walls are located along Ladder Street.

Plans to build escalators at five sections of Ladder Street were considered by the Transport and Housing Bureau but were abandoned in 2010 due to heritage concerns.

In popular culture
Ladder Street was one of the filming locations of the 1960 film The World of Suzie Wong.

See also
Ladder streets
Chung Wan (constituency) and Sheung Wan (constituency)

References

Further reading

External links

 
 Antiquities Advisory Board. Pictures of Ladder Street
 Entry at gwulo.com

Ladder streets in Hong Kong
Sheung Wan
Grade I historic buildings in Hong Kong
Roads on Hong Kong Island